Garston and Halewood is a constituency created in 2010 represented in the House of Commons of the UK Parliament since 2010 by Maria Eagle of the Labour Party.

History
Creation
The seat was created for the 2010 general election during the Boundary Commission for England's review of constituencies.

Political history
The 2015 re-election of frontbencher Maria Eagle (Lab) made the seat the 11th safest of Labour's 232 seats by percentage of majority.

Boundaries

The City of Liverpool wards of Allerton and Hunts Cross, Belle Vale, Cressington, Speke-Garston, and Woolton, and the Metropolitan Borough of Knowsley wards of Halewood North, Halewood South, and Halewood West.  The boundaries have been drawn to date almost square, favouring neither riverside nor inland reach.

The constituency covers most of the previous Liverpool Garston (part of the city of Liverpool), together with the most southerly part of the borough of Knowsley (previously in the Knowsley South constituency).

Constituency profile

Two parts of the political division are green — land surrounding its airport (including the National Trust for Places of Historic Interest or Natural Beauty's archetypal Tudor Speke Hall and grounds) and in the north east, parts of Hough Green and Tarbock Green. The remainder is urban and forms the southern tip of the Merseyside metropolitan county (of mid-size among the 1974-enacted units). The constituency as drawn stretches along the most up-river part of the Mersey Estuary before its brief start between Cheshire and the remainder of its former county of Lancashire, on a near-flat riverside. The history of the City of Liverpool (right) bank of the Mersey witnessed in the late 20th century the ceasing of shipbuilding and a sharp decline in trade, rail distribution and manufacturing prompting mass unemployment. Its now-modest socially rented housing stock alleviated overcrowding of Liverpool. The constituency also includes Liverpool Airport

Deprivation is low for the metropolitan county and marginally higher than the region as a whole.  As at the 2011 census 60% of housing was owner-occupied (compared to 64.5% in the North West of England region).  At the same census 9.1% of households were deprived in three or the maximum of four dimensions measured by the ONS — in the region the figure is 7.0%.

Members of Parliament

Elections

Elections in the 2010s

* Served as an MP in the 2005–2010 Parliament

See also
List of parliamentary constituencies in Merseyside

Notes

References

Politics of the Metropolitan Borough of Knowsley
Politics of Liverpool
Liverpool parliamentary constituencies
Parliamentary constituencies in North West England
Constituencies of the Parliament of the United Kingdom established in 2010